Coleophora karakurti is a moth of the family Coleophoridae. It is found in Turkey.

References

karakurti
Moths of Asia
Endemic fauna of Turkey
Moths described in 1994